Leptotrichia buccalis is an anaerobic, Gram-negative rod bacteria. It is a constituent of normal oral flora.

Morphology
Leptotrichia species are typically large, fusiform-shaped, non-sporulating, and non-motile rods.

Pathology
Almost every case of severe infection with Leptotrichia buccalis reported in medical literature occurred in patients with neutropenia.

References

Further reading

External links
Type strain of Leptotrichia buccalis at BacDive -  the Bacterial Diversity Metadatabase

Gram-negative bacteria
Fusobacteriota
Bacteria described in 1879